Aegista intonsa is a species of air-breathing land snail, a terrestrial pulmonate gastropod mollusk in the family Camaenidae. 

This species is endemic to Japan.

References

intonsa
Endemic fauna of Japan
Gastropods described in 1902
Taxonomy articles created by Polbot